Luis Alberto "Kunty" Caicedo Medina (born 11 May 1992) is an Ecuadorian footballer who plays as a central defender.

Club career
Caicedo played for Independiente del Valle, playing a crucial part in defense as the team finished runners-up in the 2016 Copa Libertadores. In December 2016 Caicedo signed a five-year deal for Brazilian side Cruzeiro.

Disciplinary
In October 2016 Caicedo was suspended for three matches while playing for Independiente for cursing at a referee after a match against Emelec. Afterwards Caicedo claimed that it was the referee who initiated the confrontation and allegedly insulted and made racist remarks about Caidedo's Afro-Ecuadorian ethnicity.

In a match that same month on 11 October in a world cup qualifying match against Bolivia Caicedo was sent off on his second international cap for picking up two yellow cards. In another world cup qualifying match against on 28 March 2017 Caicedo was again sent off for two bookable offenses as Ecuador lost 0–2.

Honours
LDU Quito
Copa Ecuador: 2019
Supercopa Ecuador: 2020, 2021

References

External links
 
 

1992 births
Living people
Sportspeople from Guayaquil
Ecuadorian footballers
Ecuador international footballers
Ecuadorian expatriate footballers
Association football central defenders
C.S.D. Independiente del Valle footballers
Cruzeiro Esporte Clube players
Barcelona S.C. footballers
C.D. Veracruz footballers
L.D.U. Quito footballers
Ecuadorian Serie A players
Campeonato Brasileiro Série A players
Liga MX players
Expatriate footballers in Brazil
Ecuadorian expatriate sportspeople in Brazil
Expatriate footballers in Mexico
Ecuadorian expatriate sportspeople in Mexico